Ajaokuta Airstrip or Ajaokuta Airfield is an airstrip  southwest of Ajaokuta, a town in the Kogi State in Nigeria.

See also

Transport in Nigeria
List of airports in Nigeria

References

External links
OpenStreetMap - Ajaokuta
OurAirports - Ajaokuta

Airports in Nigeria
Kogi State
Airports in Yorubaland